The Capture of Cannanore during the Third Anglo-Mysore War took place on 17 December 1790.  Forces of the British East India Company, led by General Robert Abercromby, began besieging Cannanore (now known as Kannur), held by troops of Mysore and of the Sultan Ali Raja of Cannanore on 14 December.  After gaining control of the high ground commanding the city's main fort, the defenders surrendered.  The British victory, along with the taking of Calicut by a separate force a few days earlier, secured their control over the Malabar Coast.

Order of battle
British forces
3,000+ British soldiers of the HM 77th Regiment
1st Bombay Native Infantry
2,000 Nairs
Mysorean forces
5,000+ Mysoreans
Mappilas

References

External links 
Mysore Wars Heritage History
Cannanore Gazetteer 1857
Robert Abercromby (1740-1827)
Tippoo Sultan (1753-1799)

Further reading 
Logan, William Malabar Manual, Volume 1

See also
Mysore invasion of Kerala

Cannanore
Mysorean invasion of Malabar
Cannanore 1790
Cannanore 1790
Cannanore 1790
Military history of British India
History of Kerala
1790 in India